Banaji Limji Agiary is the oldest Zoroastrian fire temple (or agiary, Gujarati for "house of fire") in Mumbai, India that was constructed in 1709. The fire was consecrated here by the Parsi businessman Seth Banaji Limji. The temple has a fortress-like structure and non-Parsis are not allowed to enter, as in all Zoroastrian temples. The temple is a Grade II heritage structure. Situated less than a kilometre away from the temple, Maneckji Seth Agiary (1733) is the second-oldest fire temple in Mumbai.

See also
 List of fire temples in India

References

Fire temples in India
1709 establishments in India
Religious buildings and structures completed in 1709
Religious buildings and structures in Mumbai